The Battle of Bosra refers to a military operation launched by Syrian rebels during the Syrian Civil War, in order to capture the city of Bosra.

The battle
On 21 March 2015, the offensive was launched by rebels on Syrian Army positions in and around Bosra.

On 24 March 2015, rebels advanced in the town and besieged a number of soldiers in the ancient citadel, which the Army relieved after a counterattack. The Syrian Air Force launched 10 airstrikes on the town, while 30 barrel bombs were also dropped that day. The Army also fired rockets on the nearby Maaraba hospital, where injured rebels were being treated, which completely levelled the building.

On 25 March 2015, FSA rebels backed by Islamist factions captured the town and its UNESCO archaeological sites. According to a pro-government source, Army and militia units retreated from their positions in the town after the promised reinforcements were not deployed.

Aftermath
On 29 March, local clashes took place in Glen town between the Islamic Muthanna Movement and al-Sunna lions brigade after an "argument" occurred about dividing the seized weapons and ammunition from Bosra. One fighter from the Islamic Muthanna Movement was killed, while three fighters were injured from both sides in the clashes.

References

Daraa Governorate in the Syrian civil war
Bosra 2015
Bosra
Bosra 2015
Bosra
Bosra
Bosra 2015
Bosra
Bosra